Jeffrey W. Smith is Director, Program for Excellence in Nanotechnology, Center on Proteolytic Pathways, Tumor Microenvironment at of the Burnham Institute. Jeff earned his Ph.D. in biological sciences at UC Irvine in 1987. Following postdoctoral training at The Scripps Research Institute, he was appointed to their staff in 1991. Dr. Smith was recruited to The Burnham Institute in 1995.

See also
 Nanotechnology
 The Proteolysis Map

References

External links
 Burnham Institute for Medical Research: Jeffrey W. Smith Faculty page
 Jeffrey W. Smith, Selected list of publications via PubMed, (NIH National Library of Medicine)

Scripps Research
Living people
Year of birth missing (living people)